Robert Sinclair Hunter (27 March 1904 – 25 March 1950) was a Canadian rower who competed in the 1924 Summer Olympics. In 1924 he won the silver medal as crew member of the Canadian boat in the eights event.

References

External links
profile

1904 births
1950 deaths
Canadian male rowers
Olympic rowers of Canada
Olympic silver medalists for Canada
Rowers at the 1924 Summer Olympics
Olympic medalists in rowing
Medalists at the 1924 Summer Olympics
20th-century Canadian people